Peter Pen (born 14 June 1972 in Maribor) is a Slovenian former alpine skier who competed in the 1998 Winter Olympics and 2002 Winter Olympics.

External links
 sports-reference.com
 

1972 births
Living people
Slovenian male alpine skiers
Olympic alpine skiers of Slovenia
Alpine skiers at the 1998 Winter Olympics
Alpine skiers at the 2002 Winter Olympics
Sportspeople from Maribor
20th-century Slovenian people